Vauban may refer to:

 Sébastien Le Prestre, Seigneur de Vauban, a French military engineer
 A list of Vauban's fortifications
 Vauban (train), an express train linking Belgium and Switzerland
 Vauban, Freiburg, a neighbourhood of Freiburg, Germany
 Lycée Vauban (Luxembourg), a secondary school in Luxembourg
 Vauban, Saône-et-Loire, a commune in the Saône-et-Loire département
 , a Lamport & Holt Line steamship (built 1912)